Kinloss railway station served the village of Kinloss, Moray, Scotland from 1858 to 1966 on the Inverness and Aberdeen Junction Railway.

History 
The station opened on 25 March 1858 by the Inverness and Aberdeen Junction Railway. It was resited on 18 April 1860, to the east, but it was moved back to its original location in May 1904. It closed to passengers on 3 May 1965 and completely on 7 November 1966.

References

External links 

Disused railway stations in Moray
Railway stations in Great Britain opened in 1858
Railway stations in Great Britain closed in 1965
Beeching closures in Scotland
1858 establishments in Scotland
1966 disestablishments in Scotland
Former Highland Railway stations